Qulaq Kasan (also Romanized as Qūlāq Kasan) is a village in Golidagh Rural District, Golidagh District, Maraveh Tappeh County, Golestan Province, Iran. At the 2006 census, its population was 732, in 124 families.

References 

Populated places in Maraveh Tappeh County